Grid Iron Theatre Company is a Scottish theatre company.

Between 2003 and 2010 the company won six awards in the Critics' Awards for Theatre in Scotland.

The company performs in a wide variety of venues, which have included a cancer hospital in Jordan, a former morgue in Cork, and Mary King's Close in 1997 before it was opened up as a tourist attraction.

References

External links

Theatre companies in Scotland